Elections to Manchester Borough Council were held in 1949.  One third of the council was up for election, the council stayed under Labour Party control.

After the election, the composition of the council was

Labour Party (Labour)
Liberal Party (Liberal)
Independent Candidates (Ind, Ind1, Ind2...)
Conservative Party (Cons)

Candidates and Ward Results
Below is a list of the 36 individual wards with the candidates standing in those wards and the number of votes the candidates acquired.

Ward results

Crumpsall

Electorate 19,663 Turnout 51.2% Voters 10,092

Davyhulme West

References

1949
Manchester
1940s in Manchester